Oleksiy Ivanov (born 9 January 1978, Ukrainian SSR, Soviet Union) is a Ukrainian football midfielder who plays for FC Kharkiv in the Ukrainian Premier League. He moved from Naftovyk during the summer transfer season.

References

External links
 Profile on Official Website
 

1978 births
Living people
Ukrainian footballers
Ukraine international footballers
Ukrainian Premier League players
FC Karpaty Lviv players
FC Arsenal Kyiv players
FC Naftovyk-Ukrnafta Okhtyrka players
SC Tavriya Simferopol players
FC Kharkiv players
FC Oleksandriya players
Association football midfielders